Elvira Vasilkova (born 15 May 1962) is a Belarusian former breaststroke swimmer who competed in the 1980 Summer Olympics.

References

1962 births
Living people
Belarusian female breaststroke swimmers
Olympic swimmers of the Soviet Union
Swimmers at the 1980 Summer Olympics
Olympic silver medalists for the Soviet Union
Olympic bronze medalists for the Soviet Union
Olympic bronze medalists in swimming
Medalists at the 1980 Summer Olympics
Olympic silver medalists in swimming
Soviet female breaststroke swimmers